Althepus christae is a species of spider of the genus Althepus. It is endemic to the Chinese province of Yunnan.

References

Psilodercidae
Endemic fauna of Yunnan
Spiders of China
Spiders described in 2013